Sarcohyla robertsorum is a species of frog in the family Hylidae.
It is endemic to Mexico.
Its natural habitats are subtropical or tropical moist montane forests and rivers.
It is threatened by habitat loss.

The frog is named after H. Radclyffe Roberts and his wife Hazel Roberts, who collected the holotype.

References

Amphibians described in 1940
Taxonomy articles created by Polbot
robertsorum